Flabellate means "fan-shaped" and may refer to:

flabellate, a leaf shape in plants
flabellate, an antenna shape in insects

See also 
 flabellata, a term appearing in species names, see